CFWF-FM is a Canadian radio station owned by Harvard Media, and is licensed to Regina, Saskatchewan. It broadcasts on the assigned frequency of 104.9 MHz, and is branded as 104.9 The Wolf, playing an active rock format.

The station was launched in 1982 as CKIT-FM, an easy listening station. In 1989, it began calling itself K105 FM, with a similar format, and later identified as Magic 104.9 and Hot 105. On January 5, 1996, it adopted "The Wolf" branding, with a rock format.

In 2017, CFWF won the award for best medium-market radio station at the Canadian Music and Broadcast Industry Awards.

References

External links
104.9 The Wolf

Fwf
Fwf
Fwf
Radio stations established in 1982
1982 establishments in Saskatchewan